Jernhusen AB owns and runs railway stations and other buildings attached to the railway network in Sweden. The company was formed on 1 January 2001 as part of the break-up of Statens Järnvägar, the former national railway. It remains wholly owned by the Swedish government.

External links
 
Jernhusen Facebook

Government-owned companies of Sweden
Swedish companies established in 2001
Railway companies of Sweden
Railway companies established in 2001
Companies based in Stockholm